This series of NZR diesel-electric locomotive may refer to:

 The NZR DF class English Electric locomotive of 1954.
 The New Zealand DF class locomotive (1979) General Motors Electro-Motive Division locomotive of 1979.